George E. Stoddard (January 7, 1917 – March 30, 2009) was a real estate financier who pioneered the use of the sale-and-leaseback transaction.

Stoddard was born in Perry, in Union County, Oregon, in 1917. His family moved east in 1928, living in Eastchester, New York. Stoddard earned a bachelor's degree from Brigham Young University, an MBA from Harvard Business School, and a law degree from Fordham University.

He worked for 34 years at the Equitable Life Assurance Society before joining W. P. Carey & Co. in 1979. At W. P. Carey, Stoddard chaired the independent investment committee, personally reviewing ever deal raised by the firms' acquisition team. "If he didn't approve of a deal, it wouldn't get done," William Polk Carey, the firm's chairman, is reported to have said.

References 

1917 births
2009 deaths
American financiers
Brigham Young University alumni
Fordham University alumni
Harvard Business School alumni
20th-century American businesspeople